Francisco de Quiñones, O.F.M., (Latin: Franciscus Cardinal Quignonius) (also Francisco de los Ángeles) (ca. 1482 in Kingdom of León – November 5, 1540 in Veroli, Papal States) was a Spanish Franciscan friar and later cardinal who was responsible for some reforms in the Catholic Church in Spain.

Biography

Having completed his studies, he successively discharged all the various offices of his Order as Custos, Commissary General, and Vicar General of the Observant branch of the Order. In 1521 he had obtained special permission and faculties from Pope Leo X to go to the missions in the Americas, together with Friar Jean Glapion, confessor of Emperor Charles V. Glapion died in the same year, however, and Quiñones was elected Commissary General of the Ultramontane Franciscans—those north of the Alps (1521–23). At the General Chapter of the Order held in Burgos in 1523, he was elected Minister General of the Order (1523–27).

As Minister General, he visited the friaries of Spain (1523–25), as well as a great part of Italy and the Spanish Netherlands (1525–27). He promoted studies, maintained general discipline, and was not less active in behalf of missions. In 1524 he sent twelve missionaries to Mexico, among them Friar Juan Juárez, who later became the first bishop within the present territory of the United States.

After the sack of Rome in 1527 and the imprisonment of Pope Clement VII (May, 1527), Quiñones, who was distantly related to the Emperor, and was also his confidant, seemed the man best able to effect the release of the pope, and a full reconciliation between him and the emperor. He was thrice sent to the emperor for this purpose, and his efforts were crowned with success by the deliverance of Pope Clement (December, 1527), and the Treaty of Barcelona (1528) and Cambrai (1529). As these embassies rendered his effective government of the Order impossible, Quiñones renounced the generalship in December 1527, and in September of the following year he was created cardinal of the title of S. Croce in Gerusalemme, hence his name "Cardinal of the Holy Cross". From 1530 to 1533 he was also Bishop of Coria, in Spain, and for a short time, in 1539, administrator of Acerno (Naples), but he was never Cardinal Bishop at Palestrina, as some authors assert.

As a cardinal, Quiñones always occupied a distinguished position in the Sacred College and closely followed the movement of the Reformation in Germany. When Pope Paul III contemplated assembling a general Council at Mantua, he sent (1536) the Cardinal of the Holy Cross to Emperor Ferdinand I, King of the Romans and of Hungary, to promote that cause. The cardinal, however, died in 1540 and did not live to see the opening of the Council of Trent in 1545. His body was brought from Veroli to Rome and buried in his titular church, Santa Croce in Gerusalemme, in a tomb which he had prepared himself.

Quiñones left some legislative compilations for his Order, but is best known for his reform of the Roman Breviary undertaken by the order of Pope Clement. This he began in 1535 and it was issued in that year by Pope Paul III. A second recension followed in 1536. It was primarily intended for private use but (with permission) it began to be used in many religious houses and more than 100 editions were printed between 1536 and 1566. However it was subject to much criticism for its disregard of tradition and Pope Paul IV banned it in 1558.

References

Further reading
 

1480s births
1540 deaths
Spanish Friars Minor
16th-century Spanish cardinals
Ministers General of the Order of Friars Minor
Franciscan cardinals